Ubiquitin-conjugating enzyme E2 N is a protein that in humans is encoded by the UBE2N gene.

Function 

The modification of proteins with ubiquitin is an important cellular mechanism for targeting abnormal or short-lived proteins for degradation. Ubiquitination involves at least three classes of enzymes: ubiquitin-activating enzymes, or E1s, ubiquitin-conjugating enzymes, or E2s, and ubiquitin-protein ligases, or E3s. This gene encodes a member of the E2 ubiquitin-conjugating enzyme family. Studies in mouse suggest that this protein plays a role in DNA postreplication repair.

Interactions 

UBE2N has been shown to interact with:
 AURKA, 
 HLTF, 
 TRAF2, 
 TRAF6,  and
 UBE2V1.

References

Further reading